Haba Snow Mountain is a mountain rising above the northwest side of Tiger Leaping Gorge in Yunnan, China. It rises opposite the higher Yulong Xueshan, and towers 3,500 metres above the upper reaches of the Yangtze River, also known as the Jinsha River. The summit of the mountain is a popular destination for amateur mountaineers and its lowest slopes are crossed by the popular Tiger Leaping Gorge trail.

The Haba Snow Mountain massif is considered the southernmost extent of the expansive Shaluli Mountains, themselves a component range of the Hengduan Mountains.

See also
 Three Parallel Rivers of Yunnan Protected Areas - Unesco World Heritage Site
 List of Ultras of Tibet, East Asia and neighbouring areas

References

Mountains of Yunnan
Five-thousanders of the Transhimalayas
Geography of Dêqên Tibetan Autonomous Prefecture